The results of elections to the Labour Party's Shadow Cabinet (more formally, its "Parliamentary Committee") were announced on 26 October 1984. In addition to the 15 members elected, the Leader (Neil Kinnock), Deputy Leader (Roy Hattersley), Labour Chief Whip (Michael Cocks), Labour Leader in the House of Lords (Cledwyn Hughes), and Chairman of the Parliamentary Labour Party (Jack Dormand) were automatically members.

Footnotes
Notes

References

1984
Labour Party Shadow Cabinet election
Labour Party (UK) Shadow Cabinet election